Department of Law is a department under the Government of West Bengal in West Bengal, India. This is the main legal policy making and advisory authority of State Government.

History 
Initially the works of Legal policy making and legislative drafting were entrusted to the Legislative Department of the Government of West Bengal. The Department of Law was established on March, 1958 after amalgamation of Legislative and Judicial Department of the State government. This were also sub divided into Judicial and Legislative in 1963. In 1988 the Legislative Department was renamed as the Law Department with effect from 1 March 1988. The headquarters of this Department situated in the main block, Writers' Building, Kolkata.

Activities 
The Department has two branches, the Legislative Branch and the Official Language Branch. The Law Department is assigned with the legislative drafting, publication of notifications, Bills, Ordinances and amendments to Bill and Acts, rules and by-laws through official gazettes of the other administrative Departments of the West Bengal. It also performs periodical revision, correction of orders, settlement of Statutory notifications, regulations whenever necessary. Further this Department deputes West Bengal Legal Service officers in various departments to look after the court cases concerned.

Ministers 
Presently the Minister-in- charge of this department is Moloy Ghatak, leader of the All India Trinamool Congress.

References 

Government departments of West Bengal
Law of India